The 2016 Sudanese protests (Arabic: 2016 احتجاجات السودان) was a widespread protest movement and violent demonstrations between April-December in Sudan in 2016 against new austerity measures and the killing of a student, Abubakr Hassan, that was met with violent police repression. After the killing of the student participating in a demonstration, a wave of popular student-led anti-government demonstrations against the government of longtime ruler Omar al-Bashir, who took power in 1989 and has faced the third biggest political challenge yet. The prices of diesel and the non-affordability of basic goods has also provoked widespread protests. Violent clashes erupted after police charged on demonstrators with batons demanding justice, end to Police brutality and centred on other demands and the response by protesters was pelting stones.

Protests continued in other towns and cities in May by students. After mew austerity measures was Announced, protesters rallied in the streets on 30 November and 1 December in Khartoum and was met with Tear gas. Growing anger and public rallies fuelled by the government and the country’s situation spilled into the streets amid street opposition demonstrations in cities. On 19 December, a civil disobedience campaign took place in the nation as strikes was pulled out, being the last day of the popular movement. Lawyers, activists and standers participated in the protests.

See also
 2011-2013 protests in Sudan

References

2016 protests
Protests in Sudan